Pogled may refer to: 

In Montenegro:
Pogled (mountain), a mountain peak in Kosovo, Serbia, and Montenegro

In Serbia:
Pogled, Arilje, a settlement in the Municipality of Arilje

In Slovenia:
Pogled, Moravče, a settlement in the Municipality of Moravče
Pogled, Apače, a settlement in the Municipality of Apače